The Thundering Herd is a 1925 American silent Western film, now lost. It is directed by William K. Howard and starring Jack Holt, Lois Wilson, Noah Beery, Sr. and Raymond Hatton. Based on Zane Grey's 1925 novel of the same name and written by Lucien Hubbard, the film is about a trader who uncovers a scheme to blame the Indians for a buffalo-herd massacre. It was one of a series of critically and commercially successful Zane Grey westerns produced by Jesse Lasky and Adolph Zukor for Paramount Pictures.

Synopsis
Exhibitors Herald, November 8, 1924:

Thousands of buffalo, collected in one huge herd through the assistance of the United States government, are The Thundering Herd that will play such a thrilling part in this new story of the old West written by Zane Grey. With Jack Holt, Lois Wilson, and Noah Beery, under the direction of William Howard, maker of those two big successes, The Border Legion and The Code of the West, The Thundering Herd is certain to be thunderin' good Western melodrama. The beginning of the picture introduces an episode that is historic, if for no other reason that it shows the trend of the pioneer thought in the youth of 1850. Tod Doan at the age of 24 is left alone on a Kansas farm with heritage of $200. The $200 went for a gun and a horse, and Tod Doan joined a party of Buffalo hunters. This is Jack Holt's role in this new Zane Grey picture. Holt, as Tod Doan, finds himself in a party riding into Texas under the leadership of a fine old plainsman named Hudnall. He meets Milly Fayre, played by Lois Wilson, ward of a crooked gambler named Jett who together with a group of outlaws are making buffalo hunting a pretext to cover their banditry. Until she is 18, Milly is under Fayre’s guardianship, but when she falls in love with Doan she promises...that she will marry him as soon as she is of age. For a time, Tom loses sight of her as she is taken to a freighting station to be safe from the Indians. In the meanwhile Tod hunts buffalo with the Hundall party until Hundall is murdered by Indians. Then the buffalo hunters organize and drive the Indians from Texas. Looking for Milly, a year later, Doan is told that Jett has taken her away. Jett and his partners quarrel and shoot it out. All are killed. Terrified by the tragedy, Milly drives over the prairies toward the freighting station, but she is sighted and pursued by braves with hardly a chance of escape until she notices a stamping herd of buffalo bearing down across the plain. If Milly can widen the distance between her and the Indians there is a chance that the buffalos will cut off the Indians' pursuit. That is about as original a climax to a story as Zane Grey has ever devised.

Cast

Lists of Shoshone and Arapaho individuals who appeared in the film (and in The Covered Wagon) are held in the U.S. National Archives.

Gallery

Context
 Jack Holt was the father of cowboy actor Tim Holt.
 Charles Ogle played the original screen Frankenstein's monster in Thomas Edison's 1910 version of Frankenstein, predating the Boris Karloff interpretation by more than two decades.
 The film was remade in a 1933 sound version, The Thundering Herd, with some of the cast (Beery and Hatton) playing the same parts but Randolph Scott playing Jack Holt's role, with Scott's hair darkened and a moustache added so as to match original footage featuring Holt that was incorporated into the later version to hold down costs.
 Noah Beery Sr. was the slightly older brother of fellow screen legend Wallace Beery and father of Noah Beery Jr. ("Rocky" in the 1970s television series The Rockford Files).
 Raymond Hatton was making a series of comedies as half of an unofficial comedy team with Noah Beery's brother Wallace Beery during this period.
  It was also from the novel on which this film is based that Marshall University took its unique nickname as the Thundering Herd.
 Tim McCoy directed the Native American actors.
 Gary Cooper appears in a small uncredited role.

Production
 The silent black-and-white film is 70 minutes (7 reels, 7,187 feet).
 Filming locations included Yellowstone National Park, the Sierra Nevada mountains, and Calabasas, California. The Sierra Nevada shots, filmed somewhere near the state line, were for a blizzard sequence.
 The entire bison population of Yellowstone, some 2,000 individuals, was rounded up for use in the stampede scene.

Reception
Variety compared the cinematography to the art of Frederic Remington. Mordaunt Hall of The New York Times also referenced Remington and wrote:

{{blockquote|Grace Kingsley in Los Angeles Times: The Thundering Herd is one of those pictures that after it has served its excellent purpose in the way of entertainment in this day, should be folded up and put away for colleges and high schools to look at fifty years from now. Perhaps never shall we again see another buffalo herd stampeding...never shall we again see a more interesting picture as regards an Indian pow-wow...certainly never shall we have so interesting an exhibition of universal Indian sign language as that in which these real braves of several tribes communicate with each other during their councils. These things are additionally interesting because they are vital part of absorbing story of The Thundering Herd.}}

Anges Smith in Picture Play'':

See also
 Wind River reservation

References

External links

 
 

1925 films
American black-and-white films
Paramount Pictures films
Films directed by William K. Howard
1925 Western (genre) films
Lost Western (genre) films
Lost American films
1925 lost films
Silent American Western (genre) films
Films based on works by Zane Grey
1920s English-language films
1920s American films